Ulsan Bridge (Hangul: 울산대교) is a suspension bridge in the south coast of South Korea. Opened in 2015, it is the second longest bridge span in South Korea.

See also
 Transportation in South Korea
 List of bridges in South Korea

References

External links

 
 

Suspension bridges in South Korea
Bridges completed in 2015
Road bridges
Toll bridges in South Korea